Jacob Daniel Waguespack (born November 5, 1993) is an American professional baseball pitcher for the Orix Buffaloes of Nippon Professional Baseball (NPB). He has played in Major League Baseball (MLB) for the Toronto Blue Jays.

High school and college
Waguespack attended Dutchtown High School in Geismar, Louisiana. In his senior season, he pitched to an 8–2 win–loss record, 0.37 earned run average (ERA), and 87 strikeouts in 53 innings. He was selected by the Pittsburgh Pirates in the 37th round of the 2012 Major League Baseball draft, but did not sign, and went to the University of Mississippi, where he played three seasons for the Ole Miss Rebels. Waguespack saw limited action in his first two seasons of college baseball, pitching as both a starter and reliever. In his third and final season with the Rebels, he made 25 relief appearances and posted a 3.33 ERA and 34 strikeouts in 46 innings pitched.

Professional career

Philadelphia Phillies
Undrafted after leaving Mississippi, Waguespack signed with the Philadelphia Phillies organization and was assigned to the Rookie-level Gulf Coast League Phillies. He finished the season with the Short Season-A Williamsport Crosscutters, and posted a combined 0–1 record, 2.00 ERA, and 32 strikeouts in 27 innings. Waguespack played the entire 2016 season with the Class-A Lakewood BlueClaws, and went 4–2 with a 3.52 ERA and 72 strikeouts in 43 relief appearances. He began the 2017 season as a reliever with the Advanced-A Clearwater Threshers, and was later converted into a starting pitcher. Waguespack was promoted to the Double-A Reading Fightin Phils in August, where he continued to pitch as a starter. In 105 total innings, he pitched to a 9–7 record, 3.42 ERA, and 108 strikeouts.

Waguespack began the 2018 season with Reading, and was later promoted to the Triple-A Lehigh Valley IronPigs.

Toronto Blue Jays

On July 31, he was traded to the Toronto Blue Jays for Aaron Loup. Waguespack was assigned to the Triple-A Buffalo Bisons for the remainder of the 2018 season, and finished the year with a combined 6–10 record, 4.80 ERA, and 112 strikeouts in 122 innings. The Blue Jays added him to their 40-man roster after the 2018 season.

Major Leagues

On May 26, 2019, Waguespack was called up by the Blue Jays. He made his major league debut the next day, pitching four innings of relief against the Tampa Bay Rays. Waguespack allowed three runs (two earned) and set a Blue Jays franchise record for the most strikeouts for a reliever in their debut with seven. On July 3, he earned his first major league win, throwing five innings and allowing three runs as the Blue Jays beat the Boston Red Sox 6–3. On August 22, in a start against the Los Angeles Dodgers, Waguespack threw seven scoreless innings, allowing only one hit and retiring the final fourteen batters he faced. In doing so, he became just the sixth pitcher in franchise history to record a start of at least seven innings with no runs and one hit allowed in his first ten career games. Waguespack appeared in sixteen games for the Blue Jays in 2019, thirteen of which were starts and three of which were extended relief outings. He posted a 4.38 ERA and struck out 63 batters in 78 innings.

With the 2020 Toronto Blue Jays, Waguespack appeared in 11 games, compiling a 0-0 record with 8.15 ERA and 16 strikeouts in 17.2 innings pitched. On March 6, 2021, Waguespack was designated for assignment following the waiver claim of Joel Payamps. On March 10, Waguespack cleared waivers and was outrighted to the Triple-A Buffalo Bisons. returning to Buffalo for the Bisons' 2021 Opening Day roster
Following the 2021 season, Waguespack became a free agent.

Orix Buffaloes
On December 17, 2021, Waguespack signed with the Orix Buffaloes of Nippon Professional Baseball. He played a key role as the team's closer in 2022, most notably earning three saves in the 2022 Japan Series, including one in Game 7, contributing to Orix's first Japan Series championship since 1996, and their first since the merger with the Osaka Kintetsu Buffaloes in 2004. He was also the only active foreigner on the team's roster during their Japan Series run. On December 23, 2022, he resigned a one-year contract extension for the 2023 season.

References

External links

1993 births
Living people
American expatriate baseball players in Canada
Baseball players from Texas
Buffalo Bisons (minor league) players
Clearwater Threshers players
Florida Complex League Phillies players
Lakewood BlueClaws players
Lehigh Valley IronPigs players
Major League Baseball pitchers
Ole Miss Rebels baseball players
Orix Buffaloes players
Reading Fightin Phils players
Sportspeople from Waco, Texas
Toronto Blue Jays players
Williamsport Crosscutters players